1st Division or First Division may refer to:

Military

Airborne divisions
1st Parachute Division (Germany)
1st Airborne Division (United Kingdom)
1st Airmobile Division (Ukraine)
1st Guards Airborne Division

Armoured divisions
1st Armoured Division (Australia)
1st Canadian Armoured Division (subsequently renamed the 5th Canadian Division)
1st Armored Division (People's Republic of China)
1st Armored Division (France)
1st Light Mechanized Division (France)
1st Panzer Division (Bundeswehr), (West) Germany
1st Panzer Division (Wehrmacht), Nazi Germany
Fallschirm-Panzer Division 1 Hermann Göring, Nazi Germany
1st Armoured Division (India)
1st Tank Division (Imperial Japanese Army)
1st Armoured Division (Poland)
1st Mechanised Division (Poland)
1st Mechanized Division (Soviet Union)
1st Armoured Division (United Kingdom)
1st Armored Division (United States)
1st Armoured Division (Syria)
1st Guards Mechanized Corps (Soviet Union)
1st Tank Division (Soviet Union)
1st Armored Brigade (People's Republic of China), formerly the 1st Tank Division, then 1st Armored Division

Artillery divisions 

 1st Anti-Aircraft Division (Japan)
 1st Anti-Aircraft Artillery Division (Soviet Union)
 1st Anti-Aircraft Division (United Kingdom)

Aviation divisions
1st Fighter Division (China)

Cavalry divisions
 1st Light Cavalry Division (France)
 1st Foot Cavalry Division (France)
 1st Cavalry Division (German Empire)
 1st Cavalry Division (Reichswehr), Weimar Republic, Germany
 1st Cavalry Division (Wehrmacht), Nazi Germany
 1st Light Division (Germany)
 1st Indian Cavalry Division, British Indian Army during World War I
 1st Cavalry Division "Eugenio di Savoia", Royal Italian Army
 1st Cavalry Division (Poland)
 1st Guard Cavalry Division (Russian Empire)
 1st Cavalry Division (Soviet Union)
 1st Cavalry Division (United Kingdom)
 1st Mounted Division (United Kingdom)
 1st Cavalry Division (United States)

Infantry divisions
1st Guards Infantry Division (Russian Empire)
1st Guards Infantry Division (German Empire)
1st Division (Australia)
1st Infantry Division (Belgium)
1st Canadian Division
1st Commonwealth Division
1st Division (Colombia)
1st Division (Estonia)
1st Colonial Infantry Division (France)
1st Free French Division
1st Division (German Empire)
1st Infantry Division (Wehrmacht), Nazi Germany
1st Mountain Division (Wehrmacht), Nazi Germany
1st Mountain Division (Bundeswehr), West Germany
1st Naval Infantry Division (Wehrmacht), Nazi Germany
1st Ski Division (Wehrmacht) Nazi Germany
1st SS Panzer Division Leibstandarte SS Adolf Hitler, Nazi Germany
1st Infantry Division (Azerbaijan, 1918)
1st Infantry Division (Greece)
1st Kostrad Infantry Division, Indonesia
1st Alpine Division "Taurinense", Royal Italian Army
1st CC.NN. Division "23 Marzo", Italy
1st Infantry Division "Superga", Royal Italian Army
1st Division (Imperial Japanese Army)
1st Guards Division (Imperial Japanese Army)
1st Division (Ireland)
1st Division (Japan)
1st Division (New Zealand)
1st Division (North Korea)
1st Infantry Division (Philippines)
Polish 1st Tadeusz Kościuszko Infantry Division
1st Legions Infantry Division (Poland)
1st Grenadiers Division (Poland)
1st Infantry Division (Romania)
1st Infantry Division (South Africa)
1st Infantry Division (South Korea)
1st Rifle Division (Soviet Union)
1st Caucasian Rifle Division (Soviet Union)
1st Division (South Vietnam)
1st Division (Spain)
1st Asturian Division (Spain)
1st Division (Thailand), King's Guard
1st Ukrainian Division of the Ukrainian National Army
1st Zadneprovsk Ukrainian Soviet Division
1st (African) Division, United Kingdom
1st (Peshawar) Division, British Indian Army before and during World War I
1st (United Kingdom) Division
1st London Division, United Kingdom
1st Infantry Division (United States)
1st Marine Division
1st Division (Vietnam)

Naval divisions
1st Division (Royal Navy), Home Fleet, United Kingdom

Sports

Association football
 Azadegan League, the second-tier professional football league in Iran
 Cypriot First Division, the top-flight football division in Cyprus
 Danish 1st Division, the second-tier football league in Denmark
 Football League First Division, the defunct top-flight of the English football league system
 Hong Kong First Division League, the second-highest division in the Hong Kong football league system
 Kategoria e Parë, the second-tier football league in Albania
 League of Ireland First Division, second-level division in Ireland's football league system
 Scottish Football League First Division, the second-tier football league in Scotland from 1975 to 2013
 Uzbekistan Pro League, the second-tier football league in Uzbekistan

Baseball
 First division (baseball), a general term referring to teams in the top half of league standings

See also 
Division 1 (disambiguation)
1st Rifle Division (disambiguation)
1st Regiment (disambiguation)
1st Cavalry (disambiguation)

Military units and formations disambiguation pages